The Daegu Shinmun is a local daily newspaper in Daegu, South Korea. Like most of the country's newspapers, it publishes exclusively in Korean. The headquarters are located in Dongin-dong, Jung-gu, above the Sincheon. The paper is distributed throughout Daegu and the surrounding province of Gyeongsangbuk-do, and covers national and regional events as well as local affairs.

See also
List of newspapers

External links
Official site 

Newspapers published in South Korea
Mass media in Daegu